Papillion-La Vista South High School (commonly referred to as Papio South, PLSHS, PLSouth, or PLS) is a high school in Papillion, Nebraska, United States. It is one of two high schools in the Papillion-La Vista Public School District. The school's principal is Jeff Spilker.

History
Papillion-La Vista South High School opened in the fall of 2003. A successful 2018 referendum allocated money for the expansion of Papio South's facilities to accommodate over 2,000 students.

Academics 
Papillion-La Vista South offers dual credit classes through the University of Nebraska Omaha.

Extracurricular activities

Athletics 
Papilion-La Vista South has won twelve state championships: girls' cross-country in 2010, 2014, and 2015; volleyball in 2010, 2011, 2012, 2019, 2021, and 2022; boys’ cross-country in 2017; and baseball in 2010 and 2011. The Papillion South student section is known as the "Black Hole".

Performing arts 
PLS has three competitive show choirs, the mixed-gender "Titanium", "Titan Express", as well as the all-female "Titan Radiance". The program also hosts an annual competition, the "Titan Classic". The choirs are backed by a state winning showband, "Platinum".

The school also has a competitive marching band and hosts an annual competition, "Titan Marching Invitational" for that discipline. The Titan Marching Band won the Nebraska class AA and Grand Championship at the NSBA state marching contest in 2021. The school also has two jazz bands, the top group "Silver Tones" and the lower group "Blue Notes". Both jazz bands have a reputation for Superior ratings at competitions.

The school formerly had a "Rap Club" which went on to produce four albums, Room D05 (2015), GOAT (2016), FEUD (2017), and Mixed Emotions (2018).

References

Public high schools in Nebraska
Educational institutions established in 2003
Schools in Sarpy County, Nebraska
2003 establishments in Nebraska